Malkallen is a Swedish island belonging to the Piteå archipelago. The island is located to the southwest of Malen. It has no shore connection and is uninhabited / unbuilt.

References 

Islands of Sweden